Paola Volpato Martín (b. August 5 of 1969, in Santiago de Chile) is a Chilean actress.

Personal life
Volpato is married to Chilean actor Felipe Castro with whom she has two children, Simón and Manuel. She is of Italian descent; her grandfather, Gaetano Volpato, was an Italian immigrant from Venice.

Career
In 1986, she graduated from Scuola Italiana and pursued acting studies at the University of Chile.

She began her career as an actress with a small appearance in Rojo y miel (1994) on Televisión Nacional de Chile. During the following years, she took part in various roles in the cast of María Eugenia Rencoret in productions such as Tic Tac (1997), Aquelarre (1999), Amores de mercado (2001) and Destinos cruzados (2004).

In November 2002, she obtained the prize for best actress, voted by the judges of the international festival of Viña del Mar, for her acting in the movie Tres noches de un sábado.

Volpato has done as many roles in comedy as in dramas. In 2007, she became detective Eva Zanetti in Alguien Te Mira, while in the latter half of the same year she played Blanca del Bosque in Amor por Accidente.
In 2008, Paola took part in the soap opera Viuda Alegre, where she played Mariana, ex-wife of the character played by Francisco Reyes. As of 2009, her career took off in the soap opera format, due to her role as "Consuelo Domínguez" in ¿Dónde está Elisa?, the antagonist. She later played "Paloma Subercaseaux" in Los Ángeles de Estela. Since 2014, she established her popularity on television with Pituca sin lucas and became the main actress of the Mega network.
In 2022 she won a Produ Award as best supporting actress in a telenovela for Hijos del desierto.

Filmography

TV series
Soltero a la medida, (Canal 13, 1994) - Irma
Infieles (TVN, 2004) - Daniela
Loco Por Ti (TVN, 2005) - Lisa
Tiempo Final "Simulacro" (TVN, 2005) - Sofía
La Vida es una Lotería "El Trato" (TVN, 2005) - Amanda
Herederos "El Intento" (TVN, 2007) - Trinidad

Films
''Tres noches de un sábado (2002) - Quena
 The Prince  (2019)

Theater
Marat/Sade
Buenas Noches, Mamá - Mónica
Frágil (2003) - Lía
Cangrejas (2003)
Balada (2003) - Assistante de dirección
La Señorita Julia
El Rey se Muere - la reina Margarita
Confesiones de mujeres de 30 -
Cuerpos Mutilados en el Campo de Batlla (2007) - Vera
El Mercader de Venecia
Noche de Reyes (2009) - Olivia

References

External links
 IMDB

1969 births
Chilean film actresses
Chilean telenovela actresses
Chilean people of Italian descent
Living people
People from Santiago
University of Chile alumni